This is a complete list of appearances by members of the professional playing squad of UE Lleida during the 1988–89 season.

1989
Lleida